Ulla Vuorela (30 August 1945 – 17 December 2011) was a Finnish professor of social anthropology.

Early years and education
Ulla Vuorela was born on 30 August 1945 in Helsinki. She graduated from the University of Helsinki with a major in Finno-Ugric ethnology. At the same time as studying folklore, Vuorela studied at the Sibelius Academy to become a teacher. During her studies, she taught piano at the Helsinki Conservatory between 1973 and 1976.

Research and career
Vuorela started her research career as a research assistant at the Department of Ethnology at the University of Helsinki and worked as a research assistant at the Academy of Finland. In 1989, she was appointed Assistant Professor of Social Anthropology at the University of Tampere. In her teaching and research work, she combined themes, theories and research methods in Development Studies, Women's Studies (Gender Studies) and Cultural Studies. Vuorela worked extensively with Tanzanian partners in particular. In 1999, Vuorela was appointed as the first Academy Professor at the Academy of Finland. The professorship has been devoted specifically to gender research, which was called the Women's Research in 1999. 

She died on 17 December 2011 in Helsinki.

References

1945 births
2011 deaths
Finnish anthropologists
Social anthropologists
Gender studies academics
Writers from Helsinki
University of Helsinki alumni
Academic staff of the University of Tampere
Finnish music educators
Finnish women anthropologists
Women music educators
20th-century anthropologists
21st-century anthropologists